The 2022–23 MENA Tour is the 10th season of the MENA Tour.

LIV Golf strategic alliance
Following an announcement made in October 2022, the MENA Tour announced that they had entered into a strategic alliance with LIV Golf. This was mainly due to LIV Golf attempting to gain Official World Golf Ranking points for their events by co-sanctioning them with the MENA Tour. The proposals were initially rejected by the OWGR. The first tournament added to the 2022–23 schedule was an event held in Thailand, co-sanctioned by the LIV Golf Invitational Series.

Schedule
The following table lists official events during the 2022–23 season.

Notes

References

2022 in golf
2023 in golf
Current golf seasons